Of the judges who have served on the Supreme Court of Tasmania , including Chief Justices and Puisne Judges: 13 had previously served in the Parliament of Tasmania, Algernon Montagu, Thomas Horne, Valentine Fleming, Francis Smith, William Lambert Dobson, William Giblin, John Stokell Dodds, Robert Patten Adams, Andrew Inglis Clark, Herbert Nicholls, Norman Ewing, Richard Green and Merv Everett. In addition, Norman Ewing and Merv Everett had previously served in the Australian Senate, while Alexander Macduff Baxter had previously served in the New South Wales Legislative Council. John Pedder and Thomas Horne served in the Tasmanian Legislative Council while serving as judges, while Thomas Horne was elected to the Tasmanian House of Assembly after his judicial service.

See also

 Judiciary of Australia

Notes

References

Tasmania
Judges of the Supreme Court